The Sikorsky–Boeing SB-1 Defiant (stylized as "SB>1"; company designation S-100) is the Sikorsky Aircraft and Boeing entry for the United States Army's Future Long-Range Assault Aircraft program to replace the Sikorsky UH-60 Black Hawk. It is a compound helicopter with rigid coaxial rotors, powered by two Honeywell T55 turboshaft engines; it first flew on 21 March 2019.

On 5 December 2022, the US Army selected the rival Bell V-280 Valor as the winner of the Future Long-Range Assault Aircraft program.

Development

Sikorsky Aircraft and Boeing are jointly producing a medium-lift-sized demonstrator they named SB>1 Defiant (also widely known as "SB-1") for phase one of the program. Originally planned to fly in late 2017, its first flight was delayed in April 2017 to early 2018. Once flight testing begins, the aircraft will be evaluated by the Army for further development. Sikorsky is leading the development of phase one with an aircraft based on their previous Sikorsky X2 design.

Boeing plans to lead phase two, which is the mission systems demonstrator phase. The Boeing-Sikorsky team is seen to have an advantage with their large industrial base that may result in wider support from Congress. Their transport helicopters are the most-used in the Army currently.

Up to 2013, Sikorsky and partners have spent $250 million on X2 and Raider. The team and aircraft will be separate from the S-97 Raider. The team feels confident in the SB-1 Defiant and is paying for more than half of its design costs. The last project the companies teamed up for was the RAH-66 Comanche, which started in the 1980s and cost $7 billion before being cancelled in 2004. They say that factors outside their control, like budget cuts, "requirement creep", and a long development period caused problems with the Comanche and not team dysfunctionality. Under the Comanche program, each company built different parts of the aircraft. For JMR, employees from both companies will work together. The team named the suppliers in 2015. Swift Engineering Inc. supports the program with a major portion of the airframe structure designed and manufactured at the company's facility in San Clemente, California by an integrated team of Swift and Boeing employees.

The timeline for the first flight has slipped several times. Originally scheduled for 2017, delays arose due to a requirement to implement automated fiber placement blade manufacture at the request of the U.S. Army. Further delays resulted in the first flight slipping past summer 2018.  Dynamic systems like turboshafts, transmission, and rotors were scheduled to be tested at West Palm Beach, Florida, by the end of October 2018, before ground runs in November, then first flight to reach  within six months. 

The first prototype was unveiled in December 2018, and the first flight was pushed to early 2019. Ground runs began in January 2019; 15 hours of ground tests were needed before the first flight.

The first flight took place on 21 March 2019 at Sikorsky West Palm Beach site in Florida. In the summer of 2019, flights were suspended to address a bearing issue with the main rotor. Flight testing resumed on 24 September 2019. The aircraft reached a speed of 211 knots during level flight in October 2020. By December 2020, the demonstrator had logged 26 flight hours in 31 flights over the 21 months since first flight.

Defiant X variant 
In January 2021, Sikorsky-Boeing announced the Defiant X variant, specifically designed for the Future Long-Range Assault Aircraft program. In February 2022, Sikorsky-Boeing picked Honeywell's new HTS7500 engine, a derivative of the Honeywell T55 engine that powered the SB-1 demonstrator, as the powerplant.In March 2022, Sikorsky-Boeing has selected Collins Aerospace to provide all three seating platforms and its Perigon as flight control computer.

Design
Compared to conventional helicopters, the counter-rotating coaxial main rotors and pusher propeller offer a  speed increase, a 60% combat radius extension, and 50% better performance in high-hot hover operations. 

Sikorsky has said that the X2 design is not suitable for heavy-lift size, and instead suggests the CH-53K for heavy-lift and tiltrotor for the ultra-class. However, Sikorsky plans to build the  JMR-TD (with a cabin 50% larger than the Black Hawk) at full scale to remove doubts about the scalability of the X-2 technology.

Sikorsky–Boeing states the SB-1 will be quick and nimble, with fast acceleration and deceleration, fast side-to-side movement, and the capability to hover with the tail up and nose down. The Defiant demonstrator will be powered by the Honeywell T55, which powers the CH-47 Chinook. It will be slightly modified to better operate at slower propeller speeds, down to 85% rpm.

See also

References

External links

 
 

Compound helicopters
Boeing military aircraft
Sikorsky aircraft
United States military helicopters
2010s United States experimental aircraft
Aircraft first flown in 2019
Coaxial rotor helicopters